Bhatter College Dantan, also known simply as Dantan College, is an undergraduate, coeducational college situated in Dantan, Paschim Medinipur, West Bengal. It was established in 1963. The college is under Vidyasagar University.

The college aims at overall development of the locality and its adjoining areas directly through education and indirectly through participation in various socio-economic, cultural and welfare activities.

Departments

Science

Chemistry
Physics
Mathematics

Arts and Commerce

Accreditation
Recently, Bhatter College has been awarded "A" grade by the National Assessment and Accreditation Council (NAAC). The college is also recognized by the University Grants Commission (UGC).

See also

References

External links
Bhatter College
Vidyasagar University
University Grants Commission
National Assessment and Accreditation Council

Colleges affiliated to Vidyasagar University
Educational institutions established in 1963
Universities and colleges in Paschim Medinipur district
Colleges in India
1963 establishments in West Bengal